Anthony Derek Maurice Jackson  (1918–2005) was a British paediatrician, recognised for his pioneering work in the management of cystic fibrosis.

Life
Jackson was born in Dublin in 1918. He obtained his qualification in medicine from Middlesex Hospital Medical School in 1943, then served in the Royal Army Medical Corps in Holland, Germany, and north Africa.

He later worked as a consultant paediatrician at the London Hospital and in a specialist cystic fibrosis clinic at the Queen Elizabeth Hospital for Children.

He served on the council of the Royal College of Physicians and, for ten years from 1984, as chair of the Cystic Fibrosis Trust's Research and Medical Advisory Committee.

He died on 24 December 2005.

References

External links 
 

1918 births
Place of birth missing
2005 deaths
Place of death missing
British paediatricians
Royal Army Medical Corps officers
Fellows of the Royal College of Paediatrics and Child Health
Fellows of the Royal College of Physicians